Severino Rosso (13 December 1898 – 12 December 1976) was an Italian association football manager and footballer who played as a midfielder. On 6 April 1924, he represented the Italy national football team on the occasion of a friendly match against Hungary in a 7–1 away loss. He was also part of the Italian squad for the football tournament at the 1924 Summer Olympics, but he did not play.

References

External links
 

1898 births
1976 deaths
People from Vercelli
Italian footballers
Italy international footballers
Association football midfielders
A.C. Legnano players
Calcio Foggia 1920 players
F.C. Pro Vercelli 1892 players
S.S.C. Bari players